Sunamganj Sadar is an upazila of Sunamganj District in the Division of Sylhet, Bangladesh.

Geography 
Geographically, it is situated on the northeastern part of Bangladesh. It has 50664 households and total area 268.61 km2. It is the meeting place of three different upazilas. People are comparatively rich here and love fashion. Also It is placed near the bank of the Surma which is the longest river of Bangladesh. This area has mineral resources like natural gas, mineral oil, raw material for industries, crops, fish and so on. "Tanguar haor" has been included the world heritage site which has thousand species of bird, fish, reptiles and so on are living together. Every year many Bangladeshi and foreign tourists, researchers, nature-lovers, etc. visit.

Demographics 
In the 1991 Bangladesh census, Sunamganj Sadar had a population of 303,153.  Males constituted 51.27% of the population, and females 48.73%. The population above 18 was 153,046.  Sunamganj Sadar had an average literacy rate of 23.9% (7+ years), below the national average of 32.4%. Religions: Muslim 65%, Hindu 35%, Christian 2%, Buddhist 0.72%, and others 0.28%

 the population of the upazila was approximately 367,230, with males constituting 51.32% of the population, and females 48.68% of the population (a drop of 0.5% since 1991). There were 401 villages present, with total households of 8,341, with 236 mauzas, 14 unions, 44 mahallahs, and 9 wards. The total literacy rate for both females and males was 35.3%, an increase of 2.9% since 1991.

Administration
Sunamganj Sadar Upazila is divided into Sunamganj Municipality and nine union parishads: Aptabnagar, Gourarang, Jahangirnagar, Kathair, Laxmansree, Mohonpur, Mollahpara, Rangarchar, and Surma. The union parishads are subdivided into 114 mauzas and 268 villages.

Sunamganj Municipality is subdivided into 9 wards and 44 mahallas.

Sunamganj Sadar

 Mollapara UP is a model union in Sunamganj Sadar

Technology
The city of Sunamganj is now being developed in different areas like technology, education, improvement of living system though it was far away from the modern technology. For instance, except few people, nobody knows how can use an internet or just making a phone call. However, nowadays, many residents use modern technology instead without formal education. There are five first class international standard mobile phone company like Grameen phone and Banglalink. and national mobile phone company Teletalk has been installing communication tower, BTS, and related to its even every place from city to rural areas. This area is becoming the most probable business sector for mobile companies to make a business. Now everyone has at least a mobile phone even he or she is worker. In addition, these communication companies are offering competitive call rates and data bonus. 
On the other hand, every school, college or madrasa are offering computer education. Besides, most of the coaching centers are also bestowing the basic introduction to English with computers in the city.

Notable people 
 Hason Raja, musician, mystic poet, philosopher 
 Dewan Mohammad Azraf, teacher, author, politician, journalist, philosopher

See also 
 Sunamganj
 Upazilas of Bangladesh
 Districts of Bangladesh
 Divisions of Bangladesh

References 

Upazilas of Sunamganj District